Away team may refer to:
 Away team (sports), a sports team on the road and thus without the "home advantage"
 Away team, a landing party assembled to go on extravehicular missions in Star Trek
Star Trek: Away Team, a real-time tactics video game
 The Away Team (group), a hip hop duo from North Carolina
 Away Team, a US roller soccer team
 Away Team, a US based streetwear clothing brand

See also
"Heaven's Gate Away Team", a group of members of the Heaven's Gate cult